Alec Ashworth (1 October 1939 – 1995) was an English professional footballer born in Southport, Lancashire.

Ashworth played as an inside forward and started his career at Everton. He played 12 games for Everton and scored 3 goals. He then moved to Luton Town in 1960 and scored 20 goals in 63 games. His most prolific season was 1962–63 when he played for Northampton Town, scoring 25 goals in only 30 games. He was sold by Northampton to Preston North End for £22,000 making the club a £12,000 profit.  Ashworth played out the rest of his career at Preston North End, where he played 43 games between 1963 and 1966 and scored 14 goals.  Whilst at Preston he played in the 1964 FA Cup Final.

References

1939 births
1995 deaths
Footballers from Southport
Everton F.C. players
Luton Town F.C. players
Northampton Town F.C. players
Preston North End F.C. players
English footballers
English Football League players
Association football forwards
FA Cup Final players